In yoga, Indian medicine and Indian martial arts, prana (the Sanskrit word for breath, "life force", or "vital principle") permeates reality on all levels including inanimate objects. In Hindu literature, prāṇa is sometimes described as originating from the Sun and connecting the elements.

Five types of prāṇa, collectively known as the five vāyus ("winds"), are described in Hindu texts. Ayurveda, tantra and Tibetan medicine all describe prāṇa vāyu as the basic vāyu from which the other vāyus arise.

Prana is divided into ten main functions: The five Pranas – Prana, Apana, Udana, Vyana and Samana – and the five Upa-Pranas – Naga, Kurma, Devadatta, Krikala and Dhananjaya.

Pranayama, one of the eight limbs of yoga, is intended to expand prana.

Etymology

V. S. Apte provides fourteen different meanings for the Sanskrit word  including breath or respiration; the breath of life, vital air, principle of life (usually plural in this sense, there being five such vital airs generally assumed, but three, six, seven, nine, and even ten are also spoken of); energy or vigour; the spirit or soul.

Of these meanings, the concept of "vital air" is used by Bhattacharyya to describe the concept as used in Sanskrit texts dealing with pranayama, the manipulation of the breath.  Thomas McEvilley translates prāṇa as "spirit-energy". The breath is understood to be its most subtle material form, but is also believed to be present in the blood, and most concentrated in semen and vaginal fluid.

Early references
The ancient concept of prāṇa is described in many Hindu texts, including Upanishads and Vedas. One of the earliest references to prāṇa is from the 3,000-year-old Chandogya Upanishad, but many other Upanishads use the concept, including the Katha, Mundaka and Prasna Upanishads. The concept is elaborated upon in great detail in the literature of haṭha yoga, tantra, and Ayurveda.

The Bhagavad Gita 4.27 describes the yoga of self-control as the sacrifice of the actions of the senses and of prāṇa in the fire kindled by knowledge. More generally, the conquest of the senses, the mind, and prāṇa is seen as an essential step on the yogin's path to samadhi, or indeed as the goal of yoga. Thus for example the Malinivijayottaratantra 12.5–7 directs the seeker "who has conquered posture, the mind, prāṇa, the senses, sleep, anger, fear, and anxiety" to practise yoga in a beautiful undisturbed cave.

Prāṇa is typically divided into constituent parts, particularly when concerned with the human body. While not all early sources agree on the names or number of these divisions, the most common list from the Mahabharata, the Upanishads, Ayurvedic and Yogic sources includes five classifications, often subdivided. This list includes prāṇa (inward moving energy), apāna (outward moving energy), vyāna (circulation of energy), udāna (energy of the head and throat), and samāna (digestion and assimilation).

Early mention of specific prāṇas often emphasized prāṇa, apāna and vyāna as "the three breaths". This can be seen in the proto-yogic traditions of the Vratyas among others. Texts like the Vaikānasasmārta utilized the five prāṇas as an internalization of the five sacrificial fires of a panchāgni homa ceremony.

The Atharva Veda describes prāṇa: 'When they had been watered by Prana, the plants spake in concert: 'thou hast, forsooth, prolonged our life, thou hast made us all fragrant.' (11.4–6) 'The holy (âtharvana) plants, the magic (ângirasa) plants, the divine plants, and those produced by men, spring forth, when thou, O Prâna, quickenest them (11.4–16). 'When Prâna has watered the great earth with rain, then the plants spring forth, and also every sort of herb.' (11.4–17) 'O Prâna, be not turned away from me, thou shall not be other than myself! As the embryo of the waters (fire), thee, O Prâna, do bind to me, that I may live.' (11.4)

Similar concepts 

Similar concepts exist in various cultures, including the Latin anima ("breath", "vital force", "animating principle"), Islamic and Sufic ruh, the Greek pneuma, the Chinese qi, the Polynesian mana, the Amerindian orenda, the German od, and the Hebrew ruah. Prāṇa is also described as subtle energy or life force.

Vāyus

One way of categorizing prāṇa is by means of vāyus. Vāyu means "wind" or "air" in Sanskrit, and the term is used in a variety of contexts in Hindu philosophy. Prāṇa is considered the basic vāyu from which the other vāyus arise, as well as one of the five major vāyus. Prāṇa is thus the generic name for all the breaths, including the five major vāyus of prāṇa, apāna, uḍāna, samāna, and vyāna. The Nisvasattvasamhita Nayasutra describes five minor winds, naming three of these as nāga, dhanamjaya, and kurma; the other two are named in the Skandapurana (181.46) and Sivapurana Vayaviyasamhita (37.36) as devadatta and krtaka.

Nadis

Indian philosophy describes prana flowing in nadis (channels), though the details vary. The Brhadaranyaka Upanishad (2.I.19) mentions 72,000 nadis in the human body, running out from the heart, whereas the Katha Upanishad (6.16) says that 101 channels radiate from the heart. The Vinashikhatantra (140–146) explains the most common model, namely that the three most important nadis are the Ida on the left, the Pingala on the right, and the Sushumna in the centre connecting the base chakra to the crown chakra, enabling prana to flow throughout the subtle body.

When the mind is agitated due to our interactions with the world at large, the physical body also follows in its wake. These agitations cause violent fluctuations in the flow of prana in the nadis.

Pranayama 

Prāṇāyāma is a common term for various techniques for accumulating, expanding and working with prana. Pranayama is one of the eight limbs of yoga and is a practice of specific and often intricate breath control techniques. The dynamics and laws of Prana were understood through systematic practice of Pranayama to gain mastery over Prana.

Many pranayama techniques are designed to cleanse the nadis, allowing for greater movement of prana. Other techniques may be utilized to arrest the breath for samadhi or to bring awareness to specific areas in the practitioner's subtle or physical body. In Tibetan Buddhism, it is utilized to generate inner heat in the practice of tummo.

In Ayurveda and therapeutic yoga, pranayama is utilized for many tasks, including to affect mood and aid in digestion. A. G. Mohan stated that the physical goals of pranayama may be to recover from illness or the maintenance of health, while its mental goals are: "to remove mental disturbances and make the mind focused for meditation".

According to the scholar-practitioner of yoga Theos Bernard, the ultimate aim of pranayama is the suspension of breathing, "causing the mind to swoon".
Swami Yogananda writes, "The real meaning of Pranayama, according to Patanjali, the founder of Yoga philosophy, is the gradual cessation of breathing, the discontinuance of inhalation and exhalation".

See also

 Chaitanya (consciousness)
 Chakra
 Scientific skepticism
 Qi Men Dun Jia
 Vijñāna
 Yoga Sutra

References

Sources

External links

 Prana - A Overview as per vedic scriptures along with a hymn to Prana from Atharva Veda
 Prana – overview
 Prana – Amazing Secret To Health and Wellbeing as per Yogic Science

Hindu philosophical concepts
Vitalism
Yoga concepts